"Behind a Painted Smile" is a song written by Ivy Jo Hunter and Beatrice Verdi. It was recorded in 1967 by The Isley Brothers appearing on the Soul on the Rocks album and released as a single that reached number five in the UK charts in May 1969.

Chart performance

Cover versions
Dutch singer Mathilde Santing released a cover version of the song in 1982.

References

External links
 

The Isley Brothers songs
1967 songs
Songs written by Ivy Jo Hunter
Motown singles
Song recordings produced by Ivy Jo Hunter
1969 singles
1982 singles
Tamla Records singles